Hypocalymma xanthopetalum is a species of shrub in the myrtle family Myrtaceae, endemic to the south west region of Western Australia.
 
It grows to between 0.15 and 1 metre in height and produces yellow or orange flowers between July and October (mid winter to mid spring) in its native range.

The species was first formally described by Victorian Government Botanist Ferdinand von Mueller in Fragmenta Phytographiae Australiae in 1860.

Cultivation
This species can be maintained as a well-rounded bush in cultivation and is suitable for growing in a container. It requires excellent drainage and prefers a position in full sun or partial shade. It has a degree of frost-resistance.

References

xanthopetalum
Endemic flora of Western Australia
Rosids of Western Australia
Taxa named by Ferdinand von Mueller